The 2011 Copa América de Futsal was the 10th edition of the main international futsal tournament of the South America region under FIFA rules. It took place in Argentina from 11 September to 17 September 2011.

Squads

Venues

Referees
  Marcelo Bais
  Javier Santamaría
  Gean Telles
  Ronald Silva 
  Francisco Correa 
  Joel Ruíz 
  Óscar Ortiz 
  César Málaga 
  Ricardo Sosa
  Manuel Benítez

Group stage

Group A

Group B

Knockout stage

Semi-finals

Third Place

Final

Final ranking

External links
 Official website

2011
2011
Copa América de Futsal
Futsal